Modibo Keïta (4 June 1915 – 16 May 1977) was a Malian politician who served as the first President of Mali from 1960 to 1968. He espoused a form of African socialism.

Born and raised in Bamako, Keïta began a career as a teacher in 1936 under French colonial rule before entering politics during the 1940s. In 1945, he co-founded the Sudanese Union (US) with Mamadou Konaté which became part of the African Democratic Rally (RDA) the following year to form the US-RDA. Being elected to several positions, his political prominence grew in the 1950s, and in 1959, he became Prime Minister of the Mali Federation, a short-lived federation of Mali and Senegal. Following the federation's collapse in 1960, Mali became an independent state, and Keïta became the new country's inaugural president.

As President, Keïta soon established the US-RDA as the only official party, and began implementing socialist policies based on extensive nationalization. In foreign affairs, Keïta supported the Non-Aligned Movement and maintained strong relations with the West despite his socialist leanings. A leading Pan-Africanist, he played important roles in the drafting of the charter of the Organization of African Unity and the negotiation the 1963 Bamako Accords, which ended the Sand War between Morocco and Algeria.

During the late 1960s, dissatisfaction with his regime grew due to progressive economic decline and his repressive responses to dissent. He was overthrown in the 1968 Malian coup d'état by Moussa Traoré, who succeeded him as President and sent him to prison, where he died in 1977.

Youth

Keïta was born in Bamako-Coura, a neighborhood of Bamako, which was at the time the capital of French Sudan. His family were Malian Muslims who claimed direct descent from the Keita dynasty, the founders of the medieval Mali Empire. His nickname after primary schooling was Modo. He was educated in Bamako and at the école normale William-Ponty in Dakar, where he was top of his class. Beginning in 1936, he worked as a teacher in Bamako, Sikasso and Tombouctou. He married Mariam Travélé, who was also a teacher, in September 1939.

Entering politics

Modibo Keïta was involved in various associations. In 1937, he was the coordinator of the art and theater group. Along with Ouezzin Coulibaly, he helped found the Union of French West African Teachers.

Keïta joined the Communist Study Groups (GEC) cell in Bamako.

In 1943, he founded the L'oeil de Kénédougou, a magazine critical of colonial rule. This led to his imprisonment for three weeks in 1946 at the Prison de la Santé in Paris.

In 1945 Keïta was a candidate for the Constituent Assembly of the French Fourth Republic, supported by GEC and the Sudanese Democratic Party. Later the same year, he and Mamadou Konaté founded the Bloc soudanais, which developed into the Sudanese Union.

Political life

In October 1946, the African Democratic Rally (RDA)  was created at a conference in Bamako of delegates from across French Africa. While the coalition was led by Félix Houphouët-Boigny, Keïta assumed the post of RDA Secretary-General in French Sudan, and head of the Soudanese affiliate: the US-RDA. In 1948, he was elected general councilor of French Sudan. In 1956, he was elected mayor of Bamako and became a member of the National Assembly of France. He twice served as secretary of state in the governments of Maurice Bourgès-Maunoury and Félix Gaillard. Modibo Keïta became the premier of Mali Federation in 1959. He was elected constituent assembly president of the Mali Federation on 20 July 1960, which consisted of French Sudan and Senegal. Senegal would later leave the federation.

President of Mali

After the collapse of the federation, the US-RDA proclaimed the Sudanese Republic's complete independence as the Republic of Mali. Keïta became its first president, and soon afterward declared the US-RDA to be the only legal party.

As a socialist, he led his country towards the progressive socialization of the economy; at first starting with agriculture and trade, then in October 1960 creating the SOMIEX (Malian Import and Export Company), which had a monopoly over the exports of the products of Mali, as well as manufactured and food imports (e.g. sugar, tea, powdered milk) and their distribution inside the country. The establishment of the Malian franc in 1962, and the difficulties of provisioning, resulted in a severe inflation and dissatisfaction of the population, particularly the peasants and the businessmen.

The authorities are also trying to introduce tough anti-slavery policies, which persist in some parts of the country despite the official ban.

In June 1961, he paid a state visit to the United Kingdom, where Queen Elizabeth II invested him as an honorary Knight Grand Cross of the Order of Saint Michael and Saint George. Although Keïta was initially viewed with some wariness by the United States because of his socialist views, he made it clear that he sought good relations with Washington. In September 1961, he travelled to America in the company of Sukarno and met with President John F. Kennedy. Keïta, afterward, felt that he had a friend in Kennedy.

He also resolved the Conflict between Morocco and Algeria and would also try to form a union between Ghana, and Guinea and worked tirelessly to improve relations with the countries of Senegal. He would also win the Lenin Peace Prize for his attempts on rebuilding the economy of Mali with socialism.  However Mali was dealing with financial and economic problems, made worse by an especially poor harvest in 1968 which would later lead to a coup.

On the political level, Modibo Keïta quickly imprisoned opponents like Fily Dabo Sissoko. The first post-independence elections, in 1964, saw a single list of 80 US-RDA candidates returned to the National Assembly, and Keïta was duly reelected to another term as president by the legislature.  From 1967, he started the "revolution active" and suspended the constitution by creating the National Committee for the Defense of the Revolution (CNDR). The exactions of the "milice populaire" (the US-RDA militia) and the devaluation of the Malian franc in 1967 brought general unrest.

On 19 November 1968, General Moussa Traoré overthrew Modibo Keïta in a coup d'état, and sent him to prison in the northern Malian town of Kidal.

After being transferred back to the capital Bamako in February 1977 in what was claimed to be an action by the government towards national reconciliation in preparation for his release, Modibo Keïta died, still a prisoner, on May 16, 1977. His reputation was rehabilitated in 1992 following the overthrow of Moussa Traoré and subsequent elections of president Alpha Oumar Konaré. A monument to Modibo Keïta was dedicated in Bamako on June 6, 1999.

As a Pan-Africanist

Modibo Keïta devoted his entire life to African unity. He first played a part in the creation of the Federation of Mali with Léopold Sédar Senghor. After its collapse, he moved away from Léopold Sédar Senghor, but with Sékou Touré, the president of Guinea, and Kwame Nkrumah, the President of Ghana, he formed the Union of the States of Western Africa. In 1963, he played an important role in drafting the charter of the Organization of African Unity (OAU).

In 1963, he invited the king of Morocco and the president of Algeria to Bamako, in the hope of ending the Sand War, a frontier conflict between the two nations.  Along with Emperor Haile Selassie of Ethiopia, Keïta was successful in negotiating the Bamako Accords, which brought an end to the conflict.  As a result, he won the Lenin Peace Prize that year.

From 1963 to 1966, he normalized relations with the countries of Senegal, Upper Volta and Côte d'Ivoire. An advocate of the Non-Aligned Movement, Modibo defended the nationalist movements like the Algerian National Liberation Front (FLN).

In literature

Malian author Massa Makan Diabaté satirizes Keïta's presidency in his 1979 novel Le boucher de Kouta (The Butcher of Kouta), which features a socialist, dictatorial president named "Bagabaga Daba" (literally, "ant with a big mouth"), who is later removed by a military coup.

References

Further reading

 Portions of this article were translated from the French-language Wikipedia article :fr:Modibo Keïta.
 memorialmodibokeita.org: Biographie.
"Modibo Keita." Encyclopædia Britannica. 2008. Encyclopædia Britannica Online. 6 October 2008.
The Big Read : Modibo Keïta:  A devoted pan-africanist, The Daily Observer (Gambia), Friday, 4 September 2008.
Francis G. Snyder. "The Political Thought of Modibo Keita". The Journal of Modern African Studies, Vol. 5, No. 1 (May 1967), pp. 79–106
John N. Hazard. "Mali's Socialism and the Soviet Legal Model". The Yale Law Journal, Vol. 77, No. 1 (November 1967), pp. 28–69
Modibo Keita (1915–1977), The Presidency of South Africa (2006).
A N'fa Diallo,  Mali, 48 ans après : Socialisme, dictature, révolte et révolution. Le National (Bamako), 16 September 2008.
22 septembre : Le souvenir d’un grand jour. Hady Barry,  Nouvel Horizon (Bamako), 19 September 2008.
Abdrahamane Dicko, "De l’Union française à l’indépendance : Que de chemins parcourus !". Les Echos (Bamako), 19 September 2008.
Modibo Kéita: MALI. Francis Kpatindé, Jeune Afrique, 25 April 2000.
Rosa De Jorio,  "Narratives of the Nation and Democracy in Mali. A View from Modibo Keita’s Memorial", Cahiers d'études africaines, 172, 2003.
 page on the French National Assembly website

External links 

modibokeita.free.fr: Site devoted to Modibo Keita : portrait, discussion, photos, and videos.
Article du journal Le Flambeau Bamako, Mali.(Organe de la Jeunesse Union Africaine – Mali): Modibo Keita "Notre liberté serait un mot vide de sens si nous devions toujours dépendre financièrement de tel ou tel pays".

1915 births
1977 deaths
People from Bamako
People of French West Africa
Modibo
Malian Muslims
Sudanese Union – African Democratic Rally politicians
Presidents of Mali
Prime Ministers of Mali
Foreign Ministers of Mali
Deputies of the 3rd National Assembly of the French Fourth Republic
Deputies of the 1st National Assembly of the French Fifth Republic
African socialism
Malian pan-Africanists
Leaders ousted by a coup
Malian prisoners and detainees
Prisoners and detainees of Mali
Lenin Peace Prize recipients
Honorary Knights Grand Cross of the Order of St Michael and St George
Recipients of the Order of the Companions of O. R. Tambo
Heads of government who were later imprisoned
Muslim socialists